The following is a list of churches in East Cambridgeshire.

Active churches 
There are churches in every civil parish.

The district has an estimated 71 churches for 87,800 inhabitants, a rato of one church to every 1,237 people.

Defunct churches

Map of medieval parish churches

Cambridgeshire

Central Cambridge

References 

East Cambridgeshire
Churches